The American Ecclesiastical Review was the first American Roman Catholic journal dedicated to theological scholarship.

History 
The journal was established in 1889 and published in Philadelphia until 1927. It was then housed at the Catholic University of America until it ceased publication in 1975. It was edited by Joseph Clifford Fenton, a peritus at the Second Vatican Council.

References

Catholic studies journals
Publications established in 1889
Catholic University of America academic journals
Publications disestablished in 1975